Indfødsretten may refer to:

 Indfødsretten af 1776, Danish Citizenship Act of 1776

Ships
 HDMS Indfødsretten (1776)
 HDMS Indfødsretten (1786)

See also
 Danish nationality law